Leinster was a constituency of the European Parliament in Ireland between 1979 and 2004. It elected 3 Members of the European Parliament (MEPs) in the 1979, 1984 and 1989 elections and 4 MEPs in the elections of 1994 and 1999 using the single transferable vote form of proportional representation (PR-STV).

History and boundaries
The constituency was created in 1979 for the first direct elections to the European Parliament. It comprised the counties of Carlow, Kildare, Kilkenny, Laois, Longford, Louth, Meath, Offaly, Westmeath, Wexford and Wicklow from the historic province of Leinster excluding the County Dublin area. It was abolished under the European Parliament Elections (Amendment) Act 2004 and succeeded by the new East constituency.

MEPs

Elections

1999 election

Alan Gillis lost his seat to his party running mate Avril Doyle.

1994 election

Alan Gillis replaced his party colleague Patrick Cooney who had stepped down. The Green Party gained the additional seat.

1989 election

Mark Clinton stepped down and was replaced by his party colleague Patrick Cooney.

1984 election

Justin Keating lost his seat to Jim Fitzsimmons of Fianna Fáil.

1979 election

See also
European Parliament constituencies in the Republic of Ireland

References

External links
European Parliament elections 1999 – Leinster

Leinster
European Parliament constituencies in the Republic of Ireland (historic)
1979 establishments in Ireland
2004 disestablishments in Ireland
Constituencies established in 1979
Constituencies disestablished in 2004